Jean Louis d'Usson, Marquis de Bonnac (1672-1738) was French Ambassador to the Ottoman Empire from 1716 until 1724. One of his main missions was to assure that the Ottoman Empire remained a threat to the Habsburgs, the main rival of France in Europe, a regular objective of the Franco-Ottoman alliance. He wrote Mémoire historique sur l'Ambassade de France à Constantinople.

From 1690 to 1694 he was a musketeer. In 1694 he was captain of a dragoons company.
In 1696 he entered the diplomatic service and served as secretary to his uncle :fr:François d'Usson de Bonrepaus in Denmark. In 1698 he replaced uncle François d'Usson de Bonrepaus as Chargé d'affaires in The Hague.
In 1700 he was envoy extraordinary to the Principality of Brunswick-Wolfenbüttel, were in 1701 he was replaced by uncle François d'Usson de Bonrepaus and went to the Court of Stockholm. From 1707 to 1710 he was representative at the court of Stanisław Leszczyński. In May 1711 he replaced Jean-Denis de Blécourt at El Escorial where he was till 1713 as envoy extraordinary.

Notes

Ambassadors of France to the Ottoman Empire
18th-century French diplomats
Ambassadors of France to Poland
Ambassadors of France to Sweden
Ambassadors of France to Spain